Nils Lindh (23 October 1889 – 6 February 1957) was a Swedish ski jumper. He competed in the individual event at the 1924 Winter Olympics.

References

1889 births
1957 deaths
Swedish male ski jumpers
Swedish male Nordic combined skiers
Olympic ski jumpers of Sweden
Olympic Nordic combined skiers of Sweden
Ski jumpers at the 1924 Winter Olympics
Nordic combined skiers at the 1924 Winter Olympics
Sportspeople from Stockholm